Church of San Mateo de Cangrejos of Santurce was first built in 1832 as a chapel. In 1896, State Architect Pedro Cobreros, who designed other churches in Puerto Rico, reconstructed its facade and enlarged the interior.

The church is different from others in Puerto Rico in that its not related to a municipality's urban center. When first built it was the parish church of Villa de Cangrejos but with the urban development of the metropolitan area, Santurce was absorbed into San Juan, the capital of Puerto Rico. The building is located at the highest elevation of Santurce, which allows for a view of Santurce, now a barrio of San Juan.

Its large facade has two towers with three stories in between. This feature is known as westwork; (a west-facing entrance with towers, a vestibule, and a chapel). However, in the case of this church, its main entrance faces south. Curved steps lead up to the main entrance. The church, oriented from north to south, deviates from the traditional east to west orientation. On the west side of the church is a small parish house built in the same style as the church. The buildings are separated by a fence and a garden.

The interior main floor follows the basilica form with two lateral naves which are divided by means of an arcade of six bays resting on pillars. Each bay has a small rectangular window.

Originally, the nave had a flat wooden roof which has been replaced by one of concrete with massive exposed beams of concrete. The square apse is roofed with a dome that rests on pendentives.

The floors are made of marble and have been placed diagonally from the main axis. The church had a choir floor which no longer exists and had four portholes to illuminate the altar, which have been closed.

The building is in good shape, maintaining its original character. The two main changes have been the expansion of the sacristy and the installation of an air conditioning system.

See also
 Church San José of Aibonito
 Iglesia de San Carlos Borromeo

References

Roman Catholic churches in San Juan, Puerto Rico
National Register of Historic Places in San Juan, Puerto Rico
Roman Catholic churches completed in 1832
1830s establishments in Puerto Rico
Churches on the National Register of Historic Places in Puerto Rico
Santurce, San Juan, Puerto Rico
1832 establishments in the Spanish Empire